On the Boundary of Two Worlds: Identity, Freedom, and Moral Imagination in the Baltics is an academic book series focused on the critical examination of identity, politics, and culture in the Baltic countries. By offering a wide scope of the social science and humanities disciplines, the book series encourages intercultural dialogue and pursues interdisciplinary research in the field of Baltic studies.

The book series was founded in 2004 and is published by Brill.

Editors
Founding Editor: Leonidas Donskis, Member of the European Parliament, and previously Professor and Dean of Vytautas Magnus University School of Political Science and Diplomacy, Kaunas, Lithuania
Associate Editor: Martyn Housden, University of Bradford, UK

Editorial Board 
The Editorial Board consists of:
 Timo Airaksinen, University of Helsinki, Finland
 Egidijus Aleksandravičius, Lithuanian Emigration Institute, Vytautas Magnus University, Kaunas, Lithuania
 Auksė Balčytienė, Vytautas Magnus University, Lithuania
 Stefano Bianchini, University of Bologna, Forlì Campus, Italy
 Endre Bojtar, Institute of Literary Studies, Budapest, Hungary
 Ineta Dabašinskienė, Vytautas Magnus University, Lithuania
 Pietro U. Dini, University of Pisa, Italy
 Robert Ginsberg, Pennsylvania State University, USA
 Martyn Housden, University of Bradford, UK
 Andres Kasekamp, University of Tartu, Estonia
 Andreas Lawaty, Nordost-Institute, Lüneburg, Germany
 Olli Loukola, University of Helsinki, Finland
 Bernard Marchadier, Institut d'études slaves, Paris, France
 Silviu Miloiu, Valahia University, Targoviste, Romania
 Valdis Muktupāvels, University of Latvia, Riga, Latvia
 Hannu Niemi, University of Helsinki, Finland
 Irina Novikova, University of Latvia, Riga, Latvia
 Yves Plasseraud; Paris, France
 Rein Raud, Tallinn University, Estonia
 Alfred Erich Senn, University of Wisconsin–Madison, USA, and Vytautas Magnus University, Kaunas, Lithuania
 André Skogström-Filler, University Paris VIII-Saint-Denis, France
 David Smith, University of Glasgow, UK
 Saulius Sužiedėlis, Millersville University, USA
 Joachim Tauber, Nordost-Institut, Lüneburg, Germany
 Tomas Venclova, Yale University, USA
 Tonu Viik, Tallinn University, Estonia.

Volumes

 # 36. Prelude to Baltic Linguistics. By Pietro U. Dini.  E-
 # 35. Baltic Eugenics: Bio-Politics, Race and Nation in Interwar Estonia, Latvia and Lithuania 1918-1940. Edited by Björn M. Felder and Paul J. Weindling.  E-
 #34. The Human Sausage Factory. A Study of Post-War Rumour in Tartu. By Eda Kalmre.  E-
 #33. The Life and Thought of Lev Karsavin: “Strength made perfect in weakness…”. By Dominic Rubin.  E-
 #32. Transitions of Lithuanian Postmodernism. Lithuanian Literature in the Post-Soviet Period. Edited by Mindaugas Kvietkauskas.  E-
 #31. Undigested Past. The Holocaust in Lithuania. By Robert van Voren.  E-book 
 #30.  Forgotten Pages in Baltic History. Diversity and Inclusion. Edited by Martyn Housden and David J. Smith.  E-book 
 #29.  The last ambassador. August Torma, soldier, diplomat, spy. By Tina Tamman.  E-book 
 #28.  Post-Communist Democratisation in Lithuania. Elites, parties, and youth political organisations. 1988-2001. By Diana Janušauskienė.  E-book 
 #27.  Soldiers of Memory. World War II and Its Aftermath in Estonian Post-Soviet Life Stories. Edited by Ene Kõresaar.  E-book 
 #26.  Shrinking Citizenship. Discursive Practices that Limit Democratic Participation in Latvian Politics. Edited by Maria Golubeva and Robert Gould.  E-book 
 #25.  From Recognition to Restoration. Latvia’s History as a Nation-State. Edited and Introduced by David J. Smith, David J. Galbreath and Geoffrey Swain.  E-book 
 #24.  Adopting and Remembering Soviet Reality. Life Stories of Lithuanian Women, 1945 – 1970. Editor and Author Dalia Leinarte.  E-book 
 #23.  Cold War in Psychiatry. Human Factors, Secret Actors. By Robert van Voren. 
 #22.  A cat’s lick. Democratisation and minority communities in the post-Soviet Baltic. By Timofey Agarin. 
 #21.  Selected Papers. By Vasily Sesemann. Edited by Mykolas Drunga and Leonidas Donskis. 
 #20.  1939: The Year that Changed Everything in Lithuania’s History. By Sarunas Liekis. 
 #19.  Lithuania in the 1920s. A Diplomat’s Diary. By Robert W. Heingartner. Introduction and Commentary by Alfred Erich Senn. 
 #18.  Minority Integration in Central Eastern Europe. Between Ethnic Diversity and Equality. Edited and introduced by Timofey Agarin and Malte Brosig. 
 #17.  On Dissidents and Madness. From The Soviet Union of Leonid Brezhnev to the "Soviet Union" of Vladimir Putin. By Robert van Voren.   (hardbound),  (paperback)
 #16.  The Thing and Art. Two Essays on the Ontotopy of the Work of Art. By Arvydas Šliogeris. Translated from Lithuanian by Robertas Beinartas. Introduced by Leonidas Donskis. 
 #15.  The Case for Latvia. Disinformation Campaigns Against a Small Nation. Fourteen Hard Questions and Straight Answers about a Baltic Country. By Jukka Rislakki.   (hardbound),  (paperback)
 #14.  Names of Nihil. By Arvydas Šliogeris. Translated from Lithuanian by Robertas Beinartas. Preface by Leonidas Donskis. 
 #13.  Continuity and Change in the Baltic Sea Region. Comparing Foreign Policies. By David J. Galbreath, Ainius Lašas and Jeremy W. Lamoreaux. 
 #12.  Neighbours or enemies? Germans, the Baltic and beyond. By John Hiden and Martyn Housden. 
 #11.  Making Russians. Meaning and Practice of Russification in Lithuania and Belarus after 1863. By Darius Staliūnas.
 #10.  Lost and Found. The Discovery of Lithuania in American Fiction. By Aušra Paulauskienė. 
 #9.  Lithuania 1940. Revolution from Above. By Alfred Erich Senn.
 #8.  Aesthetics. By Vasily Sesemann. Translated by Mykolas Drunga. Edited and Annotated by Leonidas Donskis.
 #7.  Vasily Sesemann. Experience, Formalism, and the Question of Being. By Thorsten Botz-Bornstein. 
 #6. Baltic Postcolonialism. Edited by Violeta Kelertas. 
 #5.  Upton Sinclair: The Lithuanian Jungle. Upon the Centenary of The Jungle (1905 and 1906) by Upton Sinclair., by Giedrius Subačius. 
 #4.  Loyalty, Dissent, and Betrayal. Modern Lithuania and East-Central European Moral Imagination, by Leonidas Donskis. Preface by Zygmunt Bauman .  
 #3.  The Baltic States and their Region. New Europe or Old?, Edited by David J. Smith.  
 #2.  Estonia. Identity and Independence, Edited by Jean-Jacques Subrenat. Translated into English by David Cousins, Eric Dickens, Alexander Harding, Richard C. Waterhouse. 
 # 1.  The Vanished World of Lithuanian Jews, Edited by Alvydas Nikžentaitis, Stefan Schreiner & Darius Staliunas.

External links
 On the Boundary of Two Worlds: Identity, Freedom, and Moral Imagination in the Baltics page on the publishers website

Baltic states
Series of non-fiction books
Rodopi (publisher) books